Georgina Susan Fitzalan-Howard, Duchess of Norfolk (born 30 January 1962), is the ex-wife of Edward William Fitzalan-Howard, 18th Duke of Norfolk.

Early life and family
She was born Georgina Susan Gore, the younger daughter of John Temple ("Jack") Gore (1931-2018) and his first wife, Serena Margaret Mounsey. Her parents divorced in 1969.

Jack Gore was very distantly connected to the Earls Temple of Stowe and was descended from Sir John Gore, Lord Mayor of London.

Her paternal grandmother, Lady Barbara Montgomerie (23 August 1909 – 1992), was eldest daughter of Archibald Montgomerie, 16th Earl of Eglinton, by his former wife Lady Beatrice Dalrymple, daughter of the 11th Earl of Stair.

Georgina's elder sister Charlotte Gore married Major Sir Hervey James Hugh Bruce-Clifton, 7th Bt. and her elder brother Christopher Gore (d. 2015) was remarried to  Catherine Dickens, a descendant of the novelist Charles Dickens, and lived in Hungary.

Personal life
Georgina worked at Colefax & Fowler as a paint specialist before her marriage.

She married Edward Fitzalan-Howard, then Earl of Arundel and Surrey, son of Miles Stapleton-Fitzalan-Howard, 17th Duke of Norfolk, and his wife, Anne Mary Teresa Constable-Maxwell, on 27 June 1987 at Arundel Cathedral; the wedding had 800 guests including, the Princess of Wales (a personal friend of the groom). The couple moved into the East wing of Arundel Castle after their marriage.

They have five children (three sons and two daughters):
Henry Miles Fitzalan-Howard, Earl of Arundel (born 3 December 1987); he is heir apparent to his father’s titles.
Lady Rachel Rose Fitzalan-Howard (born 10 June 1989)
Lord Thomas Jack Fitzalan-Howard (born 14 March 1992)
Lady Isabel Serena Fitzalan-Howard (born 7 February 1994)
Lord Philip Fitzalan-Howard (born 14 July 1996)

Lord Arundel succeeded to the Dukedom of Norfolk in 2002, and Lady Arundel then became The Duchess of Norfolk. As duchess, she stood in for Queen Elizabeth II in rehearsals for the State Opening of Parliament.

The Duke and Duchess separated in 2011, but were reconciled by 2016, only to split up again; their divorce became final in 2022. Since her divorce, she has been styled Georgina, Duchess of Norfolk.

Charitable work
The Duchess is patron of a number of charities, including:
 DePaul International
 Ferring Country Centre
 NSPCC South and Mid Sussex branch
 Arun Choral Society
 Arun Young Musicians
 Home-Start Hampshire.

Honours
She is a Deputy Lieutenant for West Sussex.

 
  Two Sicilian Royal Family: Dame Grand Officer of Justice of the Two Sicilian Royal Sacred Military Constantinian Order of Saint George

References

External links
Helen Harrison. "Out of the ruins" Daily Telegraph, 7 April 2007. Retrieved 4 December 2012.  Discusses Arundel Castle's kitchen garden and other improvements.

1962 births
Georgina
Living people
Wives of knights